No. 192 Squadron was a Royal Air Force squadron operational during the First World War as a night training squadron and during the Second World War as a radar countermeasure unit. After the war the squadron served again in the Electronic Intelligence role, until disbanded in 1958.

History

Formation in World War I
No. 192 Squadron was formed at Gainsborough, Lincolnshire on 5 September 1917 as a night training squadron operating the Royal Aircraft Factory FE.2b and FE.2d. The squadron moved to Newmarket, Suffolk in 1918 and was disbanded in December 1918.

Reformation in World War II
The squadron was re-formed on 4 January 1943 when No. 1474 Flight at RAF Gransden Lodge was re-numbered 192 (Special) Squadron. The squadron operated specially modified Vickers Wellingtons and de Havilland Mosquitos to identify German radar patterns and wavelengths. It also carried out similar missions over the Bay of Biscay and the Mediterranean. In April 1943 the squadron moved to RAF Feltwell and at the end of the year, the squadron moved again to RAF Foulsham to operate with 100 (Bomber Support) Group. During bomber raids the aircraft would provide countermeasures against German radars. The squadron disbanded at the end of the Second World War on 22 August 1945 to form the bases of the Central Signals Establishment and the Radio Warfare Establishment (RWE).

Reformed again in the Cold War
On 15 July 1951, the squadron reformed at RAF Watton as part of that same Central Signals Establishment for Operational Signals Research. Despite the name Research in the role, the squadron continued with its traditional ELectronic Signals INTelligence (ELINT) role. The squadron also used the Boeing Washington and English Electric Canberra in the ELINT role. The squadron disbanded on 21 August 1958 at Watton when it was renumbered to 51 Squadron.

Aircraft operated

See also
 List of Royal Air Force aircraft squadrons

References

Notes

Bibliography

 Bowyer, Michael J.F. and John D.R. Rawlings. Squadron Codes, 1937–56. Cambridge, UK: Patrick Stephens Ltd., 1979. .
 Flintham, Vic and Andrew Thomas. Combat Codes: A full explanation and listing of British, Commonwealth and Allied air force unit codes since 1938. Shrewsbury, Shropshire, UK: Airlife Publishing Ltd., 2003. .
 Halley, James J. The Squadrons of the Royal Air Force & Commonwealth 1918–1988. Tonbridge, Kent, UK: Air Britain (Historians) Ltd., 1988. .
 Jefford, C.G. RAF Squadrons, a Comprehensive record of the Movement and Equipment of all RAF Squadrons and their Antecedents since 1912. Shrewsbury, Shropshire, UK: Airlife Publishing, 1988 (second edition 2001). .
 Rees, William J. and John E. Espionage in the Ether: The Wartime Story of Electronic Intelligence & Radio Countermeasures Carried out by 192 (Bomber Support) Squadron. Compaid Graphics, 1999. .

External links

 Squadron history on MOD site
 History on Air of Authority – A History of RAF Organisation
 192 Squadron photos, life stories, documents, and memorabilia at the International Bomber Command Centre Digital Archive.

192 Squadron
192 Squadron
Aircraft squadrons of the Royal Air Force in World War II
Electronic warfare units and formations
Signals intelligence units and formations
Military units and formations established in 1917
1917 establishments in the United Kingdom
Military units and formations disestablished in 1958
Telecommunications in World War II